Ischioplites is a genus of longhorn beetles of the subfamily Lamiinae, containing the following species:

 Ischioplites metutus (Pascoe, 1859)
 Ischioplites salomonum Breuning, 1938

References

Pteropliini